The 2012 Eurocup Final Four was the concluding stage of the 2011–12 Eurocup season, the 10th season of the second-tier basketball league in Europe.

Euroleague Basketball Company announced that the 2011-12 Eurocup season would culminate with the Eurocup Finals in Khimki, Russia, on April 14 and 15. The host Khimki won the Eurocup title, after beating Valencia in the Final. Khimki's Zoran Planinić was named the Final Four MVP.

Bracket

Semifinals

Third place game

Final

References

External links
Official 2012 Final Four Website

Final
2012
2012
2011–12 in Russian basketball
2011–12 in Spanish basketball
2011–12 in Lithuanian basketball